Methyl Ethel is an Australian art rock band from Perth, signed to Future Classic in 2021 and formerly to Dot Dash and 4AD.

As a recording outfit, Methyl Ethel is the solo project of Jake Webb.  When performing, Webb is joined by an accompanying band, whose core members were bassist Thom Stewart and drummer Chris Wright,. Webb previously fronted Sugarpuss.

Career

2013–2020
In March 2013, Methyl Ethel released their debut expended play, Guts which was followed in November 2013 with Teeth. Lulu Ray from HappyMag said Guts is 'very vocal heavy and the lyrics describe the suburban youth condition we can all relate to' whereas Teeth is 'pretty different' and 'Webb's voice is cool, calm and collected'.

In June 2015, Methyl Ethel released their debut studio album Oh Inhuman Spectacle.

In March 2017, Methyl Ethel released their second album Everything Is Forgotten (co-produced by James Ford who is best known for his work with Arctic Monkeys and Foals) to positive reviews from publications including NME. Everything Is Forgotten peaked at number 16 on the ARIA charts. 
They have supported acts including Pond.

In April 2017, the group released a limited edition double-A sided 12" LP single of 'Architecture Lecture'/'Lagotto Romagnolo' from their debut extended plays for Record Store Day.

On 26 September 2018, the band released the track 'Scream Whole', their first new music in over a year as well as announcing some international tour dates.

In February 2019, Methyl Ethel released their third studio album Triage. It peaked at number 11 on the ARIA Charts.

In February 2020, Methyl Ethel release 'Majestic AF', the lead single from their forthcoming EP, Hurts to Laugh, which was released on 10 April 2020. The EP is made up of songs which did not make the cut for Triage.

2021–present: Future Classic and Are You Haunted?
In April 2021, Methyl Ethel released 'Neon Cheap', the first single on new label Future Classic. This was followed in September with 'Matters'.

In January 2022, Methyl Ethel released the single 'Proof' with Stella Donnelly, and announced the release of their fourth studio album, Are You Haunted?.

In July 2022, Methyl Ethel released the stand-alone single "Talk Louder" ahead of Splendour in the Grass appearance.

Discography

Studio albums

Extended plays

Singles

Notes

Awards and nominations

AIR Awards
The Australian Independent Record Awards (commonly known informally as AIR Awards) is an annual awards night to recognise, promote and celebrate the success of Australia's Independent Music sector.

|-
| rowspan="2"| AIR Awards of 2018
| Everything Is Forgotten
| Best Independent Album
| 
|-
| "Ubu"
| Best Independent Single or EP
| 
|-
| AIR Awards of 2019
| herself
| Best Independent Artist
| 
|-

Australian Music Prize
The Australian Music Prize (the AMP) is an annual award of $30,000 given to an Australian band or solo artist in recognition of the merit of an album released during the year of award. The commenced in 2005.

|-
| 2015
| Oh Inhumane Spectical
| Australian Music Prize
| 
|-
| 2019
| Triage
| Australian Music Prize
|

J Award
The J Awards are an annual series of Australian music awards that were established by the Australian Broadcasting Corporation's youth-focused radio station Triple J. They commenced in 2005.

|-
| rowspan="2"| J Awards of 2017
| Everything Is Forgotten
| Australian Album of the Year
| 
|-
| 'Ubu'
| Australian Video of the Year
| 
|-

National Live Music Awards
The National Live Music Awards (NLMAs) are a broad recognition of Australia's diverse live industry, celebrating the success of the Australian live scene. The awards commenced in 2016.

|-
| rowspan="2" | National Live Music Awards of 2016
| rowspan="2" | Methyl Ethel
| The Heatseeker Award (Best New Act)
| 
|-
| West Australian Live Voice of the Year
| 
|-
| rowspan="2" | National Live Music Awards of 2017
| rowspan="2" | Methyl Ethel
| International Live Achievement (Group)
| 
|-
| Best Live Act of the Year (People's Choice)
| 
|-
| National Live Music Awards of 2018
| Methyl Ethel
| International Live Achievement (Band)
|

WAM Song of the Year
The WAM Song of the Year was formed by the  Western Australian Rock Music Industry Association Inc. (WARMIA) in 1985, with its main aim to develop and run annual awards recognising achievements within the music industry in Western Australia.

 (wins only)
|-
| 2014
| "Rogues"
| Pop Song of the Year
| 
|-

West Australian Music Awards
The West Australian Music Industry Awards (WAMIs) are annual awards presented to the local contemporary music industry, put on annually by the Western Australian Music Industry Association Inc (WAM).

 (wins only)
|-
| rowspan=2|2015
| Methyl Ethel
| Best Pop Act 
| 
|-
| 'Twilight Driving'
| Best Single
| 
|-
| 2016
| Methyl Ethel
| Best Pop Act 
| 
|-
| rowspan=3|2017
| Methyl Ethel
| Best Pop Act 
| 
|-
| Everything Is Forgotten
| Best Album
| 
|-
| Jake Webb (Methyl Ethel) 
| Best Male Vocalist
| 
|-

References

External links
 Bandcamp website of Methyl Ethel
 Audio Tracks by Methyl Ethel
 Allmusic profile of Methyl Ethel

Musical groups from Perth, Western Australia
Art rock musical groups
Australian indie rock groups
4AD artists
Remote Control Records artists